Beat the Odds is an Australian television series which aired 1971 to 1972 on the Seven Network. The series aired for a summer season. Hosted by Malcolm Searle, it was a game show based on the visual identification of people, places and objects. It was produced by Reg Grundy Productions.

References

External links
Beat the Odds on IMDb

1971 Australian television series debuts
1972 Australian television series endings
Black-and-white Australian television shows
1970s Australian game shows
English-language television shows
Seven Network original programming